Brigade is the tenth studio album by American rock band Heart, released on March 26, 1990, by Capitol Records. The album reached number three on both the US Billboard 200 and the UK Albums Chart, while peaking at number two in Canada, Finland, and Sweden. The album's lead single, "All I Wanna Do Is Make Love to You", reached number two on the Billboard Hot 100. Subsequent singles "I Didn't Want to Need You" and "Stranded" peaked at numbers 23 and 13 on the Billboard Hot 100, respectively; "Secret", the fourth and final single, charted at number 64.  The album was also notable for containing six tracks that charted inside the Top 25 on Billboards Album Rock Tracks chart:  "Wild Child" number 3, "Tall, Dark Handsome Stranger" number 24, All I Wanna Do is Make Love To You" number 2, "I Didn't Want to Need You" number 13, "Stranded" number 25, "The Night" number 25. 

The album was followed by a successful world tour. Like its 1987 predecessor Bad Animals, Brigade is notable for having fewer writing contributions from lead members Ann and Nancy Wilson, but would be the last of Heart's albums to prominently feature outside writers.

Track listing

Personnel
Credits adapted from the liner notes of Brigade.

Heart
 Ann Wilson – lead vocals, background vocals
 Nancy Wilson – lead vocals, background vocals, electric guitar, acoustic guitar, keyboards, mandolin, blues harp, Dobro
 Howard Leese – background vocals, lead guitar, rhythm guitar, keyboards, mandolin, autoharp
 Denny Carmassi – drums
 Mark Andes – background vocals, bass

Additional musicians
 Kim Bullard – additional keyboards 
 Sterling – additional keyboards 
 Richie Zito – additional guitar

Technical
 Richie Zito – production
 Phil Kaffel – recording, mixing
 Mike Tacci – second engineer
 Randy Wine – second engineer
 Chad Munsey – second engineer
 Ed Goodreau – second engineer
 Bill Kennedy – second engineer
 Nick Jerrard – second engineer
 Katy Parks – production coordination
 Randy Skirvin – guitar tech
 Zeke Clark – guitar tech
 Don Barlow – guitar tech
 Paul Jamieson – drum tech

Artwork
 Norman Moore – art direction, design
 Michael Miller – photography

Charts

Weekly charts

Year-end charts

Certifications

References

1990 albums
Albums produced by Richie Zito
Capitol Records albums
Heart (band) albums
Albums recorded at A&M Studios